Andrew Moneypenny was an Irish Anglican churchman in the seventeenth century.

He was appointed Archdeacon of Connor in 1617 and a prebendary of Down Cathedral in 1620.

References

Archdeacons of Connor
17th-century Irish Anglican priests